Tung Kuo-yu is a Taiwanese diplomat. Between 2013 and 2017, he was the Representative of the Republic of China to the European Union and Belgium and previously served in the Ministry of Foreign Affairs.

See also
 Foreign relations of the Republic of China

References

Living people
Representatives of Taiwan to Belgium
Taiwanese Ministers of Foreign Affairs
Year of birth missing (living people)
National Chengchi University alumni
Representatives of Taiwan to the European Union